Strawberry Chapel is a parochial chapel of ease in the lower part of St. John's, Berkeley Parish in Berkeley County, South Carolina that was built in 1725. It is on Strawberry Chapel Road between South Carolina State Highway 8-44 and the West Branch of the Cooper River. Bordering Strawberry's property is the South Carolina State owned historic site of the “Town of Childsbury.” It was a planned community that was settled in 1707. The town no longer exists. They were named to the National Register of Historic Places on April 26, 1972.

History

This location was the furthest upstream that ships could travel. He established a ferry across the river.

The town of Childsbury was planned for the bluff. At one time, the town had a tavern, school, chapel, race track, general store, and ferry. A tanner, butcher, shoemaker and carpenters lived in the town. Due to the growth of nearby plantations, the town withered. By 1750, the chapel and tavern continued to be used. Fairs were held until the mid-1750s.

The chapel was a parochial chapel of ease of the Parish of St. John's, Berkeley. The designation of "parochial" meant that it had the authority to baptize and bury the dead.

By 1825, Strawberry Chapel replaced Biggins Church as the parish church. 
The town is now a South Carolina Heritage Preserve.

Town plan

The town was planned to have twenty-four blocks on Strawberry Bluff. At its center was a market square. Two other squares were named Child's Square and Dixe's Square.

Property was assigned for a college, a free school, a church, and a minister's house. A sketch of the plan for the town has been published.

Chapel architecture

The chapel is a simple, rectangular brick building covered in stucco. It has a jerkin-head roof. The south-facing facade has a double three-paneled door with a flush fanlight. There are shuttered windows on either side of this door. The west end has a single door flanked by a pair of windows. There is decorative rosette window above. The east end has two windows with the rosette window above. Extending from the north wall is a small anteroom for the vestry.

A mural tablet in memory of an early rector of the parish was moved from Biggin Church to Strawberry Chapel. The silver Communion service from Biggin Church, which had been hidden at the end of the Civil War, was found buried in a barn at the Comingtee Plantation in 1947. It is now used at services at Strawberry Chapel but is not kept on the property.

Additional pictures of the chapel are available.

Management

Strawberry Chapel has Ball-Harleston descendants actively working to protect its historic 1725 structure and graves. A major renovation is planned, with steps begun in 2018 to dry-out Chapel walls from water intrusion over-time.  Four communion services are held annually which visitors may attend.
Strawberry Chapel and its burial grounds are on private property and not open to the public. 
Although the chapel and graveyard property share a property line with the Childbury Township land, the two are completely separate entities. 
The historic Childsbury Township property is owned by the State of South Carolina and not part of Strawberry Chapel's private property.

References

External links

Properties of religious function on the National Register of Historic Places in South Carolina
Archaeological sites on the National Register of Historic Places in South Carolina
Churches completed in 1725
Churches in Berkeley County, South Carolina
Ghost towns in South Carolina
Historic American Buildings Survey in South Carolina
National Register of Historic Places in Berkeley County, South Carolina
1725 establishments in South Carolina
18th-century Episcopal church buildings
Populated places on the National Register of Historic Places